Henryk Handy (9 July 1940 – 13 April 2007) was a Polish ice hockey player. He played for Górnik Murcki and Legia Warsaw during his career. He also played for the Polish national team at the 1964 Winter Olympics. He won the Polish hockey league championship two times in his career.

References

External links
 

1940 births
2007 deaths
GKS Tychy (ice hockey) players
Ice hockey players at the 1964 Winter Olympics
Legia Warsaw (ice hockey) players
Olympic ice hockey players of Poland
People from Mysłowice
Polish ice hockey defencemen